Sidney Asher Fine (September 14, 1903 – April 23, 1982) was an American lawyer, politician and justice of the New York Supreme Court from 1956 to 1973. From 1951 to 1956, he served three terms in the U.S. House of Representatives.

Early life
Fine was born on September 14, 1903, in New York City. He graduated from City College of New York in 1923, and from Columbia Law School in 1926.

Political career

State legislature 
He was a member of the New York State Assembly (Bronx Co., 2nd D.) in 1945 and 1946.

He was a member of the New York State Senate (24th D.) from 1947 to 1950, sitting in the 166th and 167th New York State Legislatures.

Congress 
He was elected as a Democrat to the 82nd, 83rd and 84th United States Congresses, holding office from January 3, 1951, until his resignation on January 2, 1956.

New York Supreme Court 
He was a justice of the New York Supreme Court from 1956 to 1973; and an Official Referee (i.e. a Senior Judge on an additional seat) of the Supreme Court from 1974 to 1975.

Death 
He died on April 23, 1982, in New York City.

Family
He was married to Libby Poresky and their sons were Burton M. Fine who served in the New York State Assembly in the 1960s and has practiced law in New York since 1958, and Ralph Adam Fine who served on the Wisconsin Court of Appeals.

See also
List of Jewish members of the United States Congress

References

Sources

Democratic Party New York (state) state senators
Democratic Party members of the New York State Assembly
City College of New York alumni
Columbia Law School alumni
1903 births
1982 deaths
Lawyers from New York City
New York Supreme Court Justices
Democratic Party members of the United States House of Representatives from New York (state)
20th-century American politicians
20th-century American judges
Politicians from the Bronx